Emin Ismajli (born 31 May 1982 in Gnjilane) is an Kosovan football defender who plays for German lower league side FC Hitzhofen/Oberzell.

External links

Waldhof Profile

1982 births
Living people
People from Gjilan
Association football midfielders
Kosovan footballers
FC Drita players
FC Ingolstadt 04 players
SV Eintracht Trier 05 players
SV Waldhof Mannheim players
BC Aichach players
3. Liga players
Kosovan expatriate footballers
Expatriate footballers in Germany
Kosovan expatriate sportspeople in Germany
Kosovo pre-2014 international footballers